Sardar Muhammad Yasin Malik is a Pakistani businessman and former caretaker Provincial Minister of Sindh who served in 2013 caretaker ministry. He is the owner of Pakistani pharmaceutical company Hilton Pharma.

References

Living people
Provincial ministers of Sindh
Pakistani businesspeople
Pakistani company founders
Year of birth missing (living people)